The 1971 season was the Hawthorn Football Club 47th season in the Victorian Football League and 70th overall. Hawthorn finished as the minor premiers for the first time since 1963. Hawthorn qualified for the finals for the first time since 1963. Hawthorn qualified for their third Grand Final and first since 1963. Hawthorn defeated  in the Grand Final 82–75 to win their second VFL premiership and first since 1961. Peter Hudson kicked 150 goals equalling the record set by Bob Pratt in 1934.

Fixture

Premiership Season

Finals series

Ladder

References

Hawthorn Football Club seasons